The 2018 French Open – Women's Singles Qualifying was a series of tennis matches that took place from 22 May 2018 to 25 May 2018 to determine the twelve qualifiers into the main draw of the 2018 French Open – Women's singles. Two competitors also qualified as lucky losers.

Seeds

Qualifiers

Lucky losers

Draw

First qualifier

Second qualifier

Third qualifier

Fourth qualifier

Fifth qualifier

Sixth qualifier

Seventh qualifier

Eighth qualifier

Ninth qualifier

Tenth qualifier

Eleventh qualifier

Twelfth qualifier

References 
2018 French Open – Women's draws and results at the International Tennis Federation

Women's Singles Qualifying
French Open - Women's Singles Qualifying
French Open by year – Qualifying